The Chatham Motor Car Company was a Canadian brass era automobile manufacturer, based in Chatham, Ontario, from 1906 to 1909.

History 
The company was created in 1906. Investors included Joseph T. O'Keefe and Thomas A. Drew (partners in the O'Keefe and Drew pork retailers), T.K. Holmes (who became company president). W.J. Taylor (vice president), D. N. McMullen, Thomas Dillon (secretary-treasurer), J.F. Dillon (general manager).

They established a factory in a two-story building on  Adelaide Street, about halfway between McGregor Creek and King Street, previously used by Hyslop and Ronald to build fire engines. The plant had 40 employees.

The Chatham was priced at C$2500, when the Colt Runabout was priced at US$1500, the FAL US$1750, the Enger 40 and (in 1905) the Ford Model F were US$2000, while the high-volume Oldsmobile Runabout was US$650 and (in 1907) the  $700 for the Ford Model S was US$700.

Chatham did not build its own bodies, instead, they were subcontracted to William Gray & Sons, a local carriage builder.

The car earned the loyalty of its buyers, but the company suffered financial difficulties, and in 1907, it was sued by a Detroit creditor and ultimately liquidated. Chatham dentist G. W. Cornell bought the company's assets and resumed production.

In 1908, a new Chatham appeared, the Chatham 30, with a new  engine and "tulip-style" body.

The new car was entered in endurance trials and scored some successes.  One example was driven  from Arcola, Saskatchewan to Chatham by J.B. Stauffer.

The company sold only 35 cars, mainly to Chatham's wealthiest residents, before shutting down in 1909.

The factory was purchased by Detroit's Anhut Motor Car Company in 1910, which continued to manufacture badge engineered Chathams under its own brand.

The factory building still stood in the 1960s.

Notes

See also
List of defunct automobile manufacturers

Defunct motor vehicle manufacturers of Canada
Cars of Canada
1906 establishments in Ontario
Vehicle manufacturing companies established in 1906
Vehicle manufacturing companies disestablished in 1909
Defunct companies of Ontario
1909 disestablishments in Ontario
Canadian companies established in 1906
History of manufacturing in Ontario